Senator Rust may refer to:

David Rust (born 1945), North Dakota State Senate
William A. Rust (1844–1903), Wisconsin State Senate